Aleksandar Lutovac (born 28 June 1997) is a Serbian professional footballer who plays as a winger for Partizan.

Club career

Rad
With the Rad under-19 team, Lutovac won the national championship in the 2014–15 season, earning them a spot in the 2015–16 UEFA Youth League. He was subsequently promoted to the first-team squad, scoring the winning goal in a 2–1 away win over Vojvodina on his Serbian SuperLiga debut on 19 September 2015. Two months later, Lutovac signed his first professional contract with the club on a four-year deal. He netted his first brace in a 3–1 away victory at Mladost Lučani on 17 April 2016. In his first senior season with Rad, Lutovac made 23 league appearances and scored six goals. He also played regularly during the following 2016–17 season, netting four goals in 31 league appearances. On 3 March 2018, Lutovac scored his first hat-trick in a 5–0 home win over Borac Čačak. He was the team's top scorer in the 2017–18 Serbian SuperLiga with 11 goals.

Partizan
In late June 2019, Lutovac officially joined Partizan on a free transfer and was given the number 97 shirt. He made his competitive debut for the club in a 4–0 home league win over Mačva Šabac, playing the full 90 minutes. 

Lutovac scored his first goal for Partizan on 9 October 2019, in a 0-6 win against Vodojaža in the Serbian Cup round of 32. Lutovac played a total of 89 games for Partizan scored three goals and recorded eight assists.

International career
After representing Serbia at under-19 level, Lutovac became the under-21 team's second-highest scorer in their successful 2019 UEFA European Under-21 Championship qualifiers with four goals in five games. He was included in Goran Đorović's final 23-man squad for the main tournament in June 2019.

Statistics

Notes

References

External links
 
 

Association football midfielders
Association football wingers
Association football utility players
FK Partizan players
FK Rad players
Footballers from Belgrade
Serbia under-21 international footballers
Serbia youth international footballers
Serbian footballers
Serbian SuperLiga players
1997 births
Living people